Sarah Amelia Pratt Carr (July 17, 1850December 24, 1935) was an American minister and writer.

Sarah Amelia Pratt was born on July 17, 1850, in Freeport, Maine, to Louisa (Merrill) and Robert Henry Pratt. Sarah married Byron Oscar Carr in Carlin, Nevada, on February 15, 1872. She was ordained as a Unitarian minister in Lemoore, California, on April 24, 1896, and worked as a missionary in California thereafter.

As a writer, Carr published several children's books in the 1910s and The Iron Way: A Tale of the Builders of the West (1907), a historical novel about the Central Pacific Railroad.

Mary Carr Moore was her daughter. Sarah wrote the libretto to Mary's opera Narcissa (1911). Carr died on December 24, 1935, in Los Angeles.

References

Sources 
 

1850 births
1935 deaths
19th-century Unitarian clergy
20th-century American women writers
20th-century Unitarian clergy
American librettists
People from Freeport, Maine